Fort Lytton Historic Military Precinct is the main attraction of Fort Lytton National Park in Queensland, Australia. 

The Precinct contains historic Fort Lytton (a colonial coastal defence fort), and numerous other historic military buildings and structures from colonial times to the World War II. The precinct is at the epicentre of what was once a one square mile (259 ha) defence base strategically located at the mouth of the Brisbane River (the base was also called “Fort Lytton”).  The precinct also contains Fort Lytton Military Museum and is the site of regular military re-enactments. The national park is located in the Brisbane suburb of Lytton.

Gallery

Notes and references

External links
 Fort Lytton Historic Military Precinct website